HMS New Betsey was one of 11 Thames sailing barges that the Admiralty purchased in 1794 for the British Royal Navy. After the outbreak of the French Revolutionary Wars the Navy found itself without vessels capable of inshore work and riverine operations. In 1795 the Admiralty started to order purpose-built schooner or brigantine-rigged gun vessels.

New Betsy was commissioned under the command of Mr. T. Whaley in September 1796. In June 1798 Mr. John Matthew Miller took command.

The meal included the imbibing of much wine, and a disagreement developed between Miller and Dawson. Dawson left New Betsey and landed on the beach. When Miller stepped out of a boat to help the ladies disembark, Dawson came up and using his hanger, stabbed Miller, killing him. Dawson's trial took place 25 July at Maidstone, where the jury quickly found him guilty of murder. Dawson was hanged on 27 July on Penenden Heath.

The "Principal Officers and Commissioners of His Majesty's Navy" offered New Betsey, of 80 tons (bm), for sale on 24 October 1798. She sold then.

Citations and references

Citations

References
Grocott, Terence (1997) Shipwrecks of the revolutionary & Napoleonic eras (Chatham). 

Ships of the Royal Navy
1794 Admiralty purchase Thames sailing barges